Gaidamachka  is a  khutor  in Yegorlyksky District, Rostov Oblast, Russia. It is located on the banks of the Gaidamachka, a left-bank tributary of the Kugo-Yeya, itself a tributary of the Yeya, 23 km southwest of Yegorlykskaya and 103 km southeast of Rostov-on-Don, the capital of the oblast.

External links and references 
  This article is a partial translation of its corresponding in the Russian edition of Wikipedia, Гайдамачка (хутор). 

Rural localities in Rostov Oblast